Hallelooya (or Hallelujah) is a 2016 Malayalam-language film, directed by Sudhi Anna in his feature film debut and starring Narain and Meghana Raj in the lead roles. It also features Sudheer Karamana, Sunil Sukhada, K. B. Ganesh Kumar, Sasi Kalinga, Saju Navodaya and Master Eric in significant roles.  The film, produced by K. M. Surendran under the banner of Barking Dogs Seldom Bite Films, was released in May 2016.

Plot
After living 23 years in France, psychiatrist Dr. Roy (Narain) is called back to his village by Fr. Francis, the man who raised him during his childhood. He has no idea why he was asked back, but when he returns he meets his childhood friend Dr. Meera Menon (Meghna Raj) who has become a pediatrician, but meeting her again brings him memories of their being in love years earlier.

Cast 

 Narain as Dr. Roy 
 Meghna Raj as Dr. Meera Menon
 Sudheer Karamana as Thoma
 Sunil Sukhada as Sreedharan Unnithan
 K. B. Ganesh Kumar as Father Francis
 Sasi Kalinga as Outha
 Saju Navodaya as Uthaman
 Sajitha Madathil as Mary
 Devi Ajith as Susi Teacher
 Shobha Mohan as Dr. Sudha Menon
 Gayatri as Kunjamma
 Rajmohan Unnithan
 Jeeja Surendran as Vilasini
 Master Eric Zachariah  as Young Roy
 Baby Durga Premjith  as Young Meera
 Kalabhavan Niyaz as Susheelan
 Chali Pala as S.I.
 Shivaji Guruvayoor as Lazer Sir
 Poojappura Radhakrishnan as Cheriyachan
 Ancy as Sreeja
 Vinod Kedamangalam as Cheeran

Soundtrack

References

External links
 

2016 films
2010s Malayalam-language films
Indian drama films